Josip Skoko (born 10 December 1975) is an Australian former professional footballer who played as a central midfielder for North Geelong Warriors, Hajduk Split, Genk, Gençlerbirliği, Wigan Athletic, Stoke City and Melbourne Heart. Skoko has been described as a central midfielder with "superb on-ball ability, inch perfect passing, and his ability to turn defence to attack in an instant." Skoko is currently the Director of Football at North Geelong Warriors FC.

Club career

Early career
Skoko was born in Mount Gambier, he played for Mt Gambier Croatia until he was 9 years old when he and his family moved to Geelong. Skoko played for North Geelong Warriors before moving to Croatian side Hajduk Split in 1995. After four years at Stadion Poljud he signed for Belgium club Genk. At Genk he was made captain and helped the team win the title in 2001–02. He joined Turkish club Gençlerbirliği in 2003 where he spent two years before moving to English football.

Wigan Athletic
Skoko joined Premier League club Wigan Athletic for €1 million at the beginning of the 2005–06 season, although he initially failed to maintain a regular place in the first team. On 7 January 2006 Skoko signed for Football League Championship side Stoke City on loan until the end of the 2005–06 season. He played nine times for Stoke and scored twice against Sheffield United and Crystal Palace.

In the 2006–07 season, Paul Jewell showed renewed faith in Skoko giving him an extended run in the side. The transfers of Jimmy Bullard and Graham Kavanagh to Fulham and Sunderland, respectively, in the summer of 2006 left a gap in Wigan's midfield and this led to him becoming a mainstay in the Wigan Athletic midfield, partnering Paul Scharner and Denny Landzaat. He signed a new contract deal keeping him at Wigan until 2008.  
However, at the end of the season it became clear that Skoko had played his last game for the club. The two main reasons were because he did not play enough games for Wigan to trigger a clause in his contract and also the impossibility of receiving a visa for his stay in England due to his international retirement with Australia. It was decided in May 2008 that Skoko's contract would not be renewed and he was subsequently released by Wigan.

Hajduk Split
Due to various work permit issues when playing in Europe, it took a longer than expected time for Skoko to put pen to paper with a club of his choice. However, on 21 July, and after several weeks of speculation, Skoko had finally signed a two-year deal with former club Hajduk. The decision, he said, took only minutes for the club and himself to agree terms. Skoko is relishing the chance to return to the side he made more than 100 appearances for between 1995 and 1999, with a club he describes as "a second home".

Melbourne Heart
Skoko's return home to Australia to play for A-League newcomers Melbourne Heart was confirmed by the club on 19 May 2010. The club signed the former Socceroo for one season as their inaugural Australian marquee player. He was also named as one of the initial members of the leadership group. In his second game for Melbourne Heart, he suffered a hamstring injury, which forced him out of the side for at least one month. In February 2012, Skoko came out of retirement to take part in the 2012 Hawaiian Island Invitational before retiring for good.

International career
Skoko was a member of the Australia senior team for ten years, from 1997 to 2007. He made his debut for Australia against Macedonia in 1997 and was a mainstay of the Socceroos side from then on, participating in two World Cup qualifying campaigns. He also represented his country at the Olympics in 2000.

In November 2005, Skoko came on as a substitute in Australia's playoff victory over Uruguay to qualify for the 2006 FIFA World Cup. He also captained a weakened Australian side against Bahrain in an Asian Cup qualifier in 2006.

On 25 May 2006, Skoko scored a cracking volley from 25m for Australia in a 1-0 friendly victory over Greece in front of 95,103 spectators at the Melbourne Cricket Ground, which he regards as "the most legendary moment of all time". He was selected in the squad for the 2006 World Cup in Germany but did not play in any of Australia's four games.

After being named in the Australian side for a friendly match against Argentina on 11 September 2007, Skoko stated that the game would be his home farewell from international football. Skoko ended his international career 51 minutes into the match in Melbourne when he was replaced by midfielder Carl Valeri.

Career statistics

Club
Source:

International

Honours
Genk
Belgian First Division: 2001–02
Belgian Cup: 1999–2000

References

External links

 
 Melbourne Heart profile
 
 OzFootball profile
 

1975 births
Living people
People from Mount Gambier, South Australia
Association football midfielders
Australian soccer players
Australian expatriate soccer players
Australia international soccer players
Australian people of Croatian descent
Olympic soccer players of Australia
Premier League players
English Football League players
Belgian Pro League players
Croatian Football League players
Süper Lig players
North Geelong Warriors FC players
Gençlerbirliği S.K. footballers
HNK Hajduk Split players
K.R.C. Genk players
Stoke City F.C. players
Wigan Athletic F.C. players
Melbourne City FC players
Expatriate footballers in England
Expatriate footballers in Turkey
Expatriate footballers in Belgium
Expatriate footballers in Croatia
Australian expatriate sportspeople in England
Australian expatriate sportspeople in Turkey
Australian expatriate sportspeople in Belgium
Australian expatriate sportspeople in Croatia
Sportspeople from Geelong
Soccer players from Victoria (Australia)
Australian Institute of Sport soccer players
Melbourne City FC non-playing staff
Marquee players (A-League Men)
1997 FIFA Confederations Cup players
Footballers at the 2000 Summer Olympics
2001 FIFA Confederations Cup players
2004 OFC Nations Cup players
2005 FIFA Confederations Cup players
2006 FIFA World Cup players